D0 may refer to:

 d0, the d electron count of a transition metal complex
 D0 meson
 D0 experiment, at the Tevatron collider at Fermilab, in Batavia, Illinois, US
 D0 motorway (Czech Republic), the partially complete outer ring road of Prague
 Dangling bond, in chemistry
 DHL Air Limited (IATA code)

See also
 Do (disambiguation)